Hildur Humla (1889-1969) was a Swedish politician (Social Democratic Party of Sweden). 

She was MP of the Second Chamber of the Parliament of Sweden in 1938–1952.

References

1889 births

1969 deaths
20th-century Swedish politicians
20th-century Swedish women politicians
Swedish social democrats
Women members of the Riksdag